Tesfaye Sahlu (27 June 1923 – 31 July 2017) also known as Ababa Tesfaye, was an Ethiopian comedian, children's storybook author, and former singer. He provided entertainment for the Ethiopian troops of the Kagnew Battalion serving in the Korean War. He received awards from Emperor Haile Selassie, the Ethiopian Fine Art and Mass Media Prize Trust. He was most widely known for his children's television program on the Ethiopian national broadcaster EBC, where he coined the catchphrase, "Lijoch Yezare Abebawoch Yenege Freywoch" (roughly translated as "Children! Today's flowers, tomorrow's fruit!").

Early life 
Tesfaye Sahlu was born on 27 June 1923 in Kedu, a town in the Bale province of southeastern Ethiopia, to Egerssa Bedane and Yewenzwork Belete. He grew up in Harar during childhood years while attending French Mission School. He later moved to the capital Addis Ababa by the age 14, and enrolled Kokebe Tsibah School. His father, used to describe Tesfaye as "10 people in one" due to his multi-talented nature. Both of Sahlu's parents died during the Second Italo-Ethiopian War. Then, he joined City Hall Theatre along with Getachew Debalke, Getachew Mekuriya and Belay Meressa. 

Tesfaye was one of few Ethiopian artists to go in Korea in 1951 and provided entertainment for Kagnew Battalion troops in the Korean War. For his work, he was given military title of sergeant. Emperor Haile Selassie awarded him three times including posthumously award for lifetime achievements from Ethiopian Fine Art and Mass Media Prize Trust in 1998.

Career 
With the opening of the Ethiopian National Theatre in 1955, Tesfaye comedic shows reached a broad audience. During this time he was involved in 70 stage productions and appeared on television. He played many roles, including female roles, reflecting a shortage of female actresses in theatre productions. For example, he played various characters in plays including Alula Aba Nega, Ha Hu Be Sidist Wor, King Oedipus, Dawitna Orion, Othello, Ya Zawntoch Kebeb and Enat Alem Tenu. In female position, he played prominent plays "Gonderew" and "Tela Shach" due to lack of female supporting role. Tesfaye also used musical instruments like washint, krar, begena, trombone, and accordion. In addition, Tesfaye also released single titled "Anchi Alem" and "Tsehay". Tesfaye's reputations and popularity increasingly grew in the theatre with audience share.

In 1962, Tesfaye run his children television program called Ababa Tesfaye's Storytime in Ethiopian Television.  With presenting himself, it features folktales, comedy kits, dance, jigging and pantomime: by intimating people, mimicking animal sounds of various species. Tesfaye gained prominence with its catchphrase "Lijoch Yezare Abebawoch Yenege Freywoch" (translated as "children! Today's flowers, tomorrow's fruit").

Tesfaye published his first two children's books Lijoch, Ye Zare Abebawotch, Yenege Frewoch (1972) and Ke'Abbatoch Lelijjoch (1986).

Personal life 
At the time of his death, he was survived by two children and five grandchildren. Getachew Debalke, wrote a biography of Tesfaye despite discouraged by family members to reveal information.

Death 
Tesfaye died of natural causes on 31 July 2017 at his home in Addis Ababa. His funeral was held at the Holy Trinity Cathedral, where he was interred on 2 August.

Filmography

Television

Other

Theater 
Alula Aba Nega
Ha Hu Be Sidist Wor
King Oedipus
Dawitna Orion (David and Orion)
Othello
Ya Zawntoch kebeb
Enat Alem Tenu

Literature

Book 
"Children! Today's flowers, tomorrow's fruits" (Amharic: Lijoch, Yezare Abebawotch, Yenege Frewoch) (1972)
From Fathers to Kids (Amharic: Ke'abbatoch Lelijjoch) (1986)
Ababa Tesfaye and his Stories (Amharic: Ababa Tesfaye Ena Teretochachew) Volume 1-4 (2004)

Awards 
 Golden Watch Award by H.I.M. Haile Selassie 
 Lifetime Achievement Award by Ethiopian Fine Art and Mass Media Prize Trust

References 

1923 births
2017 deaths
Ethiopian comedians
Male stage actors
Ethiopian male actors
20th-century Ethiopian male actors
21st-century Ethiopian male actors
Ethiopian male writers
21st-century Ethiopian writers